Sciotropis is a genus of flatwings in the damselfly order Odonata. There are at least two described species in Sciotropis.

As a result of molecular phylogenetic studies by Dijkstra et al. in 2013, the genus Sciotropis is considered "incertae sedis", without an assigned family but within the superfamily Calopterygoidea.

Species
These two species belong to the genus Sciotropis:
 Sciotropis cyclanthorum Rácenis, 1959
 Sciotropis lattkei De Marmels, 1994

References

Megapodagrionidae
Zygoptera genera
Taxonomy articles created by Polbot